The women's keirin at the 2018 Commonwealth Games was part of the cycling programme, which took place on 8 April 2018.

Results

First round
The first two riders in each heat qualified to the second round, all other riders advanced to the first round repechages.

Heat 1

Heat 2

Heat 3

First round repechages
The first three from each heat qualified to the second round.

Heat 1

Heat 2

Second round
The first three from each heat qualified for the Gold Medal Final, all the others qualified for the 7-12th place final.

Heat 1

Heat 2

Finals
The finals were started at 20:39.

Small final

Final

References 

Women's keirin
Cycling at the Commonwealth Games – Women's keirin
Comm